Riccardo Rossi (born 7 June 1964 in Trani) is an Italian politician.

Rossi ran as an independent for the office of Mayor of Brindisi at the 2018 Italian local elections, supported by a centre-left coalition. He won and took office on 29 June 2018.

He was elected President of the Province of Brindisi on 31 October 2018.

See also
2018 Italian local elections
List of mayors of Brindisi

References

External links
 

1964 births
Living people
Mayors of Brindisi
Presidents of the Province of Brindisi
University of Bari alumni